Sokehs is a village and municipality on the main island in the state of Pohnpei, Federated States of Micronesia.

It is the location of Palikir, the federal capital.

The namesake Sokehs Peninsula is located north of the main island.

Education
Pohnpei State Department of Education operates public schools:
 Lewetik Elementary School
 Pakein Elementary School
 Palikir Elementary School
 RSP Elementary School
 Sekere Elementary School
 Sokehs Powe Elementary School

Bailey Olter High School (former Pohnpei Island Central School or PICS) in Kolonia serves students from Sokehs.

See also
 Madolenihmw
 Kitti (municipality)
 U, Pohnpei
 Nett
 Kapingamarangi
 Pingelap
 Sapwuahfik
 Nukuoro
 Mokil
 Kolonia
 Oroluk
 Palikir

References

Statoids.com, retrieved December 8, 2010

Municipalities of Pohnpei